The J. Julian Moise House, at 400 Capitan in Santa Rosa, New Mexico, was built in 1904.  It was listed on the National Register of Historic Places in 1984.  It has also been referred to as the Julian House.

It includes some elements of Colonial Revival style, including a porch with Doric columns.

Notes

References

National Register of Historic Places in Guadalupe County, New Mexico
Colonial Revival architecture in New Mexico
Houses completed in 1904